Kara  Kennedy (born 6 August 1973) is an Australian paracanoeist who has won silver medals at the 2013 and 2014 ICF Canoe Sprint World Championships.

Personal

Kennedy was born on 6 August 1973 and has spinocerebellar ataxia and has lost the eyesight in her right eye. She wears a brace on her legs to stop hyperextension. Kennedy lives on the Gold Coast, Queensland

Sporting career
Kennedy is classified as a TA (Trunk and arms) paracanoeist. She originally paddled in 6 man outriggers for approximately two years. In February 2011, she paddled in a kayak for the first time. In 2012, she was the Oceania Champion in K1 200 m, 500 m and 1000 m and V1 200 m, 500 m and 1000 m events. At the 2013 ICF Canoe Sprint World Championships in Duisburg, Germany she won the silver medal in the V1 A 200 m and placed fourth in V1 200 TA and K1 200m A events.  At the 2014 ICF Canoe Sprint World Championships in Moscow, Russia , she won the silver medal in V1 200 m A and placed sixth in V1 200 m TA. She is coached by Andrea Wood, the Australian Paracanoe Head Coach.

Recognition
2012 - Australian Paracanoeist of the Year
2013 - Australian Paracanoeist of the Year

References

1973 births
Living people
Paracanoeists of Australia
Sportspeople from the Gold Coast, Queensland
TA classification paracanoeists
Sportswomen from Queensland